Reroute to Remain (subtitled: Fourteen Songs of Conscious Insanity, and on reissue: Fourteen Songs of Conscious Madness) is the sixth studio album by Swedish heavy metal band In Flames, released in September 2002.

The album saw a major change in musical style and was met with rejection among many of the band's fanbase. The album's more accessible sound attracted many new fans and popularized In Flames' name within the American heavy metal scene, helping to secure a top spot at Ozzfest. It was the band's first album to present singles, which were Trigger and Cloud Connected. The band would continue to use guitars tuned to Drop A# on this album with some songs tuned to C standard with the exception of Transparent which was tuned down to Drop G.

Reception

Critical reception
Despite initially receiving a mixed response from fans, the album received mostly favorable reviews. In 2005, Reroute to Remain was ranked number 326 in Rock Hard magazine's book of The 500 Greatest Rock & Metal Albums of All Time.

Charts
The album peaked at No. 13 on the Billboard Independent Albums chart.

Track listing
All music is composed by Björn Gelotte, Jesper Strömblad and Anders Fridén. All lyrics are written by Anders Fridén except where noted

Credits

In Flames
Anders Fridén – vocals
Björn Gelotte – lead guitar
Jesper Strömblad – rhythm guitar
Peter Iwers – bass
Daniel Svensson – drums

Other personnel
Jesper Strömblad – music (1–15, 17)
Björn Gelotte – music (1–15, 17)
Anders Fridén – lyrics (tracks 1–15, 17), co-mixing
Helena Lindsjö – co-lyrics (1 and 10)
Örjan Örnkloo – keyboards, programming, mixing
Teddy Möller – drum tech
Daniel Bergstrand – mixing
Niklas Sundin (Cabin Fever Media) – art direction, design, photography, translation on "Colony"
Cymbal-Simon – cymbals
Takehiko Maeda – Japanese liner notes

Featured artists on "Metaphor" 
Maria Gauffin – backing vocals
Fiol-Olof – violin

Writers of "Land of Confusion"
Phil Collins
Tony Banks
Mike Rutherford

Charts

References 

In Flames albums
2002 albums
Nuclear Blast albums